Hutton Mount is a residential area in Hutton, in the borough of Brentwood in Essex.

It is largely affluent, with some homes having a value of more than £4 million.

Hutton Mount is in close proximity to Hutton and Shenfield railway station.

It is often described as feeling like a Liminal Space or like something out of a Silent Hill game.

Borough of Brentwood